Matthew John Kean (born 16 September 1981) is an Australian politician, who has served as the Treasurer of New South Wales in the second Perrottet ministry of New South Wales since October 2021. He has also served as the Minister for Energy since April 2019 and as Deputy Leader of the Liberal Party since  August 2022. He has represented Hornsby for the party in the New South Wales Legislative Assembly since 2011.

Kean previously served as the Minister for Innovation and Better Regulation from January 2017 until March 2019 in the first Berejiklian ministry and as the Minister for Environment from April 2019 until December 2021 in the second.

Early years and background
Kean grew up in the Wahroonga area and was educated at Saint Ignatius' College, Riverview before attaining a Bachelor of Business from the University of Technology, Sydney. He later completed a graduate diploma at the Institute of Chartered Accountants. While at university, he was elected to the UTS Student Representative Council and as the SRC Executive Member for the Haymarket Campus. Kean has been a member of the Liberal Party since 2001, and in 2008, he was elected vice-president of the NSW Young Liberals. During the 2003 State election campaign, Kean worked as an adviser for the Leader of the Opposition, John Brogden. He subsequently worked for Catherine Cusack MLC as an adviser while she was shadow minister for Juvenile Justice and Women.

Prior to entering Parliament, Kean was briefly an accountant at Pricewaterhouse Coopers. Aside from his brief time as an accountant, Kean's only professional experience has been as a political staffer.

He is also an avid cricketer, and long-time member of the Berowra Cricket Club.

Political career
Following announcement of the retirement of the sitting member, Judy Hopwood, Kean contested pre-selection for the safe Liberal seat against Hornsby Mayor, Nick Berman, and Hornsby Councillor, Steve Russell. Kean won endorsement and Berman announced his decision to resign from the Liberal Party and run against Kean as an independent candidate at the 2011 State election. At the election, Kean was elected; however, the party suffered a swing of 3.5 points. Kean won the seat with 62.1 per cent of the two-party vote, with Berman being his main rival.

Kean used his inaugural speech to call on the government to spend as much money on suicide prevention campaigns as it does on road safety campaigns. His call for the $10 million campaign received support from Professor Ian Hickey and the Minister for Mental Health Kevin Humphries. He has hosted an annual Youth Forum in conjunction with Black Dog institute that aimed at educating students and teachers about issues relating to mental health; and has successfully campaigned for the construction of a new mental health inpatient facility in Hornsby.

Following the resignation of Mike Baird as Premier, Gladys Berejiklian was elected as Liberal leader and sworn in as Premier. The Berejiklian ministry was subsequently formed, with Kean sworn in as the Minister for Innovation and Better Regulation, with effect from 30 January 2017. Following the 2019 state election, Kean was appointed as the Minister for Energy and Environment in the second Berejiklian ministry, with effect from 2 April 2019. Kean became embroiled in controversy soon after his appointment. In one of his first acts as Energy Minister, Kean appointed former Prime Minister Malcolm Turnbull inaugural chair of the government's net zero emissions advisory board. One week later Kean sacked Turnbull from the role, with Turnbull claiming Kean was pressured by right-wing media to do so.

Matt Kean was involved in a sexting scandal in February 2018, texting Liberal MP Eleni Petinos to seek sexual intercourse while at the same time involved in a relationship with an adviser in Prime Minister Malcolm Turnbull's office, Caitlin Keage. Ms Keage subsequently shared the illicit text messages with the media, describing it as predatory behaviour by Kean. NSW Premier Gladys Berejiklian described Kean's conduct as extremely disappointing and Kean apologised in a media statement. This followed an earlier relationship scandal involving Kean in 2016, when a former partner said on Facebook, then retracted, that Kean had been “screwing” one of Turnbull's advisers.

Kean was sued for defamation by car dealer Bevin Clayton, who alleged Kean falsely described him as dishonest and untrustworthy in social media posts.

Following the resignation of Berejiklian, Dominic Perrottet was elected as leader of the Liberal Party of New South Wales and sworn in as Premier. Kean was selected by Perrottet to succeed him as Treasurer of New South Wales, and was sworn in on 5 October 2021. In a December 2021 rearrangement of the Perrottet minister, Kean was appointed as Minister for Energy, and retained the portfolio of Treasurer.

Kean has said that NSW, which currently generates 70% of its electricity from coal, can stop using coal-fired power by 2030, but environmental activists point to the continued approval of new coal mines in NSW as making this unlikely, and have argued that NSW will struggle to reach its target of net zero emissions by 2050.

Kean has been described as a moderate Liberal, and is considered to be the leader of the moderate faction of the New South Wales Liberals.

See also

First Berejiklian ministry
Second Berejiklian ministry
First Perrottet ministry
Second Perrottet ministry

References

External links
 
 Personal website

 

Liberal Party of Australia members of the Parliament of New South Wales
1981 births
Living people
Members of the New South Wales Legislative Assembly
People educated at Saint Ignatius' College, Riverview
Treasurers of New South Wales
21st-century Australian politicians